Close is a 2022 coming-of-age drama film directed by Lukas Dhont, and written by Dhont and Angelo Tijssens, reteaming after their first feature film Girl (2018). The film stars Eden Dambrine, Gustav de Waele, Émilie Dequenne and Léa Drucker. It follows two teenage boys whose close friendship is thrown into disarray when their schoolmates notice their intimacy, causing a rift between them.

Close premiered at the Cannes Film Festival on 26 May 2022 to critical acclaim and won the Grand Prix, specialized critics praised the performances and approach to toxic masculinity. The film is a co-production between Belgium, France and the Netherlands. It was released by Diaphana Distribution in France on 1 November 2022 and by Lumière in Benelux on 2 November. On 24 January 2023, the film was nominated for the Academy Award for Best International Feature Film at the 95th Academy Awards. It also won the André Cavens Award for Best Film by the Belgian Film Critics Association. At the 12th Magritte Awards, Close received ten nominations, including Best Screenplay for Dhont, becoming the most nominated film of the ceremony.

Plot
In rural Belgium, two 13-year-old boys, Léo and Rémi, are best friends who exhibit a deeply intimate affection for one another. They have a habit of sleeping next to each other in the same bed in Rémi's bedroom. Rémi's parents, Sophie and Peter, accept this without judgment and love Léo like a second child. Léo's family also helps run agricultural work at a flower farm, where Léo and Rémi also like to play together.

After a carefree summer together, the two boys start high school and find themselves in the same class. A trio of female classmates openly ask if the two are a couple. Léo vehemently denies it, while Rémi doesn't comment on it. Léo becomes uneasy with this external perception, with instances of homophobic slurs directed towards him by boys who notice their intimacy. Wanting to avoid being ostracized, he begins new friendships and takes up ice hockey, from which he deliberately excludes Rémi. One night, while sleeping over at Rémi's, Léo decides to sleep on a separate mattress. Upon waking up, he finds Rémi sleeping on the same mattress as him. The two wrestle, starting off playfully but becoming increasingly rough, leaving Rémi hurt and confused. They don't mention the incident to their parents.

Over the school year, Léo becomes progressively distant from Rémi, despite Rémi's attempts at interaction. Léo stops sleeping over at Rémi's, starts riding his bicycle with students other than Rémi, continues participating in ice hockey, and spends more time working with his family at the farm. Rémi finally confronts Léo about why they barely spend time together anymore, to which Léo acts defensive. Distraught and angry, Rémi attacks Léo and the two fight in the playground in front of other students.

One day, after a school trip from which Rémi is absent, the class is informed that Rémi has committed suicide. Léo immediately believes that his withdrawal caused this. However, he closes off his emotions from everyone else, unable to talk to anyone about it during the class therapy sessions offered by the school. Léo also learns that Sophie was the one who found Rémi’s body. The fact that his colleagues describe Rémi in obituaries as a happy and friendly boy triggers a defiant opposition in Léo. Léo unsuccessfully tries to suppress his inner pain and cover it up by continuing to do ice hockey and gardening work with his family. Although none of his new friendships come close to the deep connection he had with Rémi, Léo is able to confide in his older brother Charlie for comfort.

Following Rémi's funeral, he knows he has to talk to Sophie, wanting to maintain his connection with her. However, Léo can't say what happened between him and Rémi, fearful of her reaction. When Sophie and Peter have dinner with Léo's family, Peter breaks down in tears when Charlie describes his plans for his future, as Sophie and Peter mourn the loss of Rémi's future. When the next summer vacation begins, Léo visits Sophie at her workplace without warning. As she drives him home in the car, he finally confesses to her that he believes Rémi's suicide is his fault for pushing him away. After an initial moment of tension, she hugs him with tenderness and comfort as they cry together, finally getting closure in their shared grief.

Sometime later, Léo tries to visit Sophie again but finds that she and Peter have moved away, leaving the house empty. Léo walks across the field where he and Rémi used to run through, remembering their connection and allowing himself to finally grieve for Rémi.

Cast
  as Léo
 Gustav De Waele as Rémi
 Émilie Dequenne as Sophie, Rémi's mother
 Léa Drucker as Nathalie, Léo's mother
 Kevin Janssens as Peter, Rémi's father
  as Charlie, Léo's older brother
 Marc Weiss as Yves, Léo's father
 Léon Bataille as Baptiste, a classmate of Léo and Rémi

Production

On 19 December 2018, it was announced that Lukas Dhont was developing a follow-up feature film to his 2018 Cannes Film Festival award-winning directorial debut Girl. Co-writer Angelo Tijssens and producer Dirk Impens were attached to re-team with Dhont for the then-untitled film, with Dhont stating that "It's going to be different but also in the style of Girl", and that "At the centre of it is a queer character." In writing the film, Dhont was inspired by psychologist Niobe Way's book, Deep Secrets: Boys’ Friendships and the Crisis of Connection, which documents her study of intimacy among teenage boys. Dhont named the film after a "close friendship," a recurring term in the book. 

There were no further developments until 23 July 2020, when it was announced that Dhont had set up an open casting call for the two male lead roles, set to be played by amateur actors, with casting scheduled to take place at the end of August. In addition, filming was scheduled to start the following summer. The casting call was open to speakers of both French and Dutch, and Dhont decided to film it in French after casting. On 20 October 2020, it was announced that the film would be titled Close and that international sales agent The Match Factory had joined the project. Dhont's brother Michael Dhont was also attached to production. On 29 June 2021, the film featured on Eurimages' annual list of co-production financing, with the fund supporting the film with €300,000.

Principal photography began on 9 July 2021. Alongside the start of production, it was also announced that Émilie Dequenne and Léa Drucker were cast in main roles. Speaking about the film, Dhont said: "Three years after the overwhelming trip of Girl, it's incredibly good to be back on the set, with this hugely talented cast and crew, especially as this story is close to my heart."

Release
Close had its world premiere in competition for the Palme d'Or at the Cannes Film Festival on 26 May 2022, where it was later awarded the Grand Prix. It also played in the Official Competition at the 2022 Sydney Film Festival, where it also won the Sydney Film Prize.

The film was released by Diaphana Distribution in France on 1 November 2022 and by Lumière in Benelux on 2 November. It was released by A24 in the United States on 27 January 2023, following a limited one-week theatrical run in New York City and Los Angeles on 2 December 2022.

At Cannes, streaming service Mubi acquired distribution rights for the United Kingdom, Ireland, Latin America, Turkey and India.

Reception

Critical reception
On the review aggregation website Rotten Tomatoes, Close holds an approval rating of 91% based on 134 reviews from critics, with an average rating of 8.4/10. The website's consensus reads, "So moving for a majority of its runtime that not even a manipulative ending can ruin the experience, Close is a tender and powerfully acted look at childhood innocence lost." On Metacritic, which uses a weighted average, the film holds a score of 81 out of 100 based on 33 reviews, indicating "universal acclaim". The film impressed critics for Dhont's script and direction, whose cinematic technique, as well as narrative structure, was praised for its ability to deal with the theme of adolescence and coming out. Critics also praised the performances of the actors in the cast. The film has been associated with Luca Guadagnino's 2017 Call Me by Your Name.

The critic Peter Bradshaw, reviewing the film for The Guardian, gave it a score of 4/5, writing that the story told is "disturbing" in that however  "wised-up teenagers probably are now about the language of relationships and LGBT issues; [...] the end of a friendship is devastating." He also finds in the relationship of the two protagonists the ability to be "outraged at what amounts to a disloyal capitulation to homophobia" since "none of the adult life experience to explain it away" exists. The journalist is also pleasantly impressed with the actors' acting, calling De Waele and Dambrine "excellent" and Dequenne and Drucker "valuable appearances." 

Leslie Felperin of The Hollywood Reporter calls the film a "heart-crushing but emotionally rich story" "about suicide and guilt" in which "Dhont and his team know just how to turn up the emotional dials with stunning magic-hour lensing," finding, however, that the narrative is "just on the brink of overkill" on the externalization of feelings, although the director "keeps the brakes on just enough" to appease them. Robbie Collin, reviewing the film for The Telegraph, gives it a score of 5/5, denoting the director's work as "flawless" as the scenes "are handled with a sure but feather-light touch," concluding that "Close is a great film about friendship, but perhaps an even greater one about being alone."

For the Italian press, Roberto Nepoti of la Repubblica divides the film's narrative into two moments, the first related to childhood in an "idyllic" atmosphere, while the second, related to adolescence, "veers to the dramatic by showing the evolution" of the protagonists, in which he denotes "the delicacy in dealing with the sensitive subject of sexuality when it is still immature and undefined." The journalist appreciates the "well-mastered" screenplay, appreciating the director's ability to do "symbolic work on the colors" surrounding the characters, although in the second half of the film Dhont "allows himself to be possessed by the temptation of the pathetic by overly soliciting the viewer's emotion."

In a poll by IndieWire of 75 critics at Cannes, Close was named the best film of the festival.  Dhont shared the Grand Prix with Claire Denis' Stars at Noon. The film also won the Sydney Film Prize in June 2022 at the Sydney Film Festival, with jury president David Wenham deeming the film "a standout" and calling it "a mature film about innocence" that "displayed a mastery of restraint, subtle handling of story, astute observations and delicate attention to finer details."

On 16 September 2022, the film was announced as Belgium's submission for the Academy Award for Best International Feature Film at the 95th Academy Awards, and made the December shortlist, before being nominated for the Academy Award on 24 January 2023.

Accolades

See also
 List of submissions to the 95th Academy Awards for Best International Feature Film
 List of Belgian submissions for the Academy Award for Best International Feature Film

References

External links
 
 

2022 films
2022 drama films
2022 LGBT-related films
2022 multilingual films
2020s Dutch-language films
2020s French films
2020s French-language films
Belgian coming-of-age drama films
Belgian LGBT-related films
Belgian multilingual films
Cannes Grand Prix winners
Dutch coming-of-age films
Dutch drama films
Dutch LGBT-related films
Dutch multilingual films
Films about suicide
Films directed by Lukas Dhont
French coming-of-age drama films
French-language Belgian films
French LGBT-related films
French multilingual films
LGBT-related coming-of-age films
LGBT-related drama films